Jonty Matthew David Messer is a British journalist and newsreader.

Early life
A sports scholar, Messer was educated at Wycliffe College in Gloucestershire, captaining both the 1XI football and 1XV rugby teams.  After graduating from the University West of the England, Bristol, Messer went on to study for a postgraduate diploma in Broadcast Journalism at the London College of Communication (LCC) between 2007 and 2008.

Career
Following his graduation from LCC, Messer began his broadcasting career with the BBC, producing programmes for Radio Wiltshire and providing rugby commentary for BBC Radio Bristol. During this time he was offered the role of afternoon newsreader at GMG Radio's Real Radio Wales, covering a variety of news and sports stories, before leaving in 2010 to pursue new opportunities.

For just over a year, Messer was the producer of the BBC Somerset Breakfast programme before being approached to join ITV News West Country as a newsroom and online journalist. During the next two years Messer progressed to produce bulletins and feature items for the flagship 6pm programme before being offered the role of Early Morning Presenter while his colleague Ellie Barker took maternity leave.

This was followed by a four month attachment with ITV's National Breakfast show Daybreak in September 2012, reporting and producing a number of stories for the two and a half hour programme.

Upon his return to ITV West Country in January 2013 Messer continued to develop his on-screen presence both as a reporter and presenter. He has covered a number of live and breaking stories, including the Bath tipper truck crash in February 2015 and Becky Watts murder investigation in March 2015.

During this time Messer was asked to present ITV News West Country, alongside Kylie Pentelow, covering for main presenter Ian Axton.

In September 2014, he was working for BBC Radio Swindon.

In January 2016 Messer took up the role as the region's sports correspondent, covering the progress of the region's football and rugby sides as well as planning, filming and anchoring the programme's four day coverage of the 2016 Cheltenham Festival.

On 22 January 2018, it was announced by ITV West Country that Messer would take up the position of main presenter at ITV News West Country fronting the 6pm edition of the programme alongside Kylie Pentelow as well as presenting the late news two nights a week. The announcement followed the departure of Mark Longhurst in September 2017. Messer was the stand-in presenter during the interim period.

Messer left ITV West Country on 27 July 2022.

References

External links
 Official Twitter

Year of birth missing (living people)
Living people
ITN newsreaders and journalists
ITV regional newsreaders and journalists